Scharnstein Airport is a private use airport located  west-southwest of Scharnstein, Upper Austria, Austria.

See also
List of airports in Austria

References

External links 
 Airport record for Scharnstein Airport at Landings.com

Airports in Austria
Upper Austria